The Yingpan man (Chinese: 营盘美男) is an ancient mummy which was excavated in the Yingpan cemetery located in the northeastern Tarim Basin. The mummy was  1.98m (6 feet 6 inches) tall, and dates to the 4th-5th centuries CE. The deceased may have been Sogdian, and he was wearing clothes decorated with Hellenistic motifs. The mummy is located in the Xinjiang Museum.

Gallery

References

Sogdians